Ottobah Cugoano, also known as John Stuart (c. 1757 – after 1791), was an abolitionist, political activist, and natural rights philosopher from West Africa who was active in Britain in the latter half of the eighteenth century. Captured in the Gold Coast and sold into slavery at the age of 13, he was shipped to Grenada in the West Indies. In 1772, he was purchased by a merchant who took him to England, where he learnt to read and write, and was freed. Later working for artists Richard and Maria Cosway, he became acquainted with several British political and cultural figures. He joined the Sons of Africa, a group of African abolitionists in Britain.

Early life
He was born Quobna Ottobah Cugoano in 1757 in Agimaque (Ajumako) in the Gold Coast (modern-day Ghana). He was a Fanti and his family was close to the local chief.

At the age of 13, Cugoano was kidnapped with a group of children, sold into slavery and transported from Cape Coast on a slave ship to Grenada. He worked on a plantation in the Lesser Antilles until he was purchased in 1772 by Alexander Campbell, a Scottish plantation owner, who took him into his household. Late in 1772, Campbell took him with him on a visit to England where Cugoano was able to secure his freedom. On 20 August 1773, he was baptised at St James's Church, Piccadilly as "John Stuart – a Black, aged 16 Years".

Abolitionist

In 1784, Cugoano was employed as a servant by the artists Richard Cosway and his wife, Maria. Through the Cosways, he came to the attention of leading British political and cultural figures of the time, including the poet William Blake and the Prince of Wales. Together with Olaudah Equiano and other educated Africans living in Britain, Cugoano became active in the Sons of Africa, an abolitionist group whose members wrote frequently to the newspapers of the day, condemning the practice of slavery.

In 1786 he played a key role in the case of Henry Demane, a kidnapped black man who was to be shipped back to the West Indies. Cugoano contacted Granville Sharp, a well-known abolitionist, who was able to have Demane removed from the ship before it sailed.

In 1787, possibly with the help of his friend Olaudah Equiano, Cugoano published an attack on slavery entitled Thoughts and Sentiments on the Evil and Wicked Traffic of the Slavery and Commerce of the Human Species (1787). By now a devout Christian, he wrote work informed by that religion. He used arguments around Christianity and global economics and politics for this cause. His writing called for the abolition of slavery and immediate emancipation of all enslaved people. It argues that an enslaved person's duty is to escape from slavery, and that force should be used to prevent further enslavement. The narrative was sent to King George III, the Prince of Wales and to Edmund Burke, a leading politician. George III, along with much of the royal family, remained opposed to abolition of the slave trade.

Four years later, in 1791, Cugoano published a shorter version of his book, addressed to the "Sons of Africa". In it, he expressed qualified support for the failed British efforts to establish a colony in Sierra Leone for London's "Poor Blacks" (mostly freed African-American slaves who had been relocated to London after the American Revolutionary War. Other early settlers were the Nova Scotian Settlers, that is Black Loyalists, also former American slaves, from Nova Scotia, who chose to move to Sierra Leone.) Cugoano called for the establishment of schools in Britain especially for African students.

In 1791 Cugoano moved with the Cosways to 12 Queen Street in Mayfair. His last known letter, written in 1791, mentions travelling to ‘upwards of fifty places’ to promote the book and that he found that ‘complexion is a predominant prejudice’. Cugoano wished to travel to Nova Scotia to recruit settlers for the proposed free colony of African Britons in Sierra Leone but it is not known if he did so.

After 1791, Cugoano disappears from the historical record and it is likely that he died in 1791 or 1792.

Commemoration 

In November 2020, an English Heritage blue plaque honouring Cugoano was unveiled on Schomberg House in Pall Mall, London where he had lived and worked with the Cosways from 1784 to 1791.

See also
 Black British elite, the class Cugoano belonged to
 List of civil rights leaders
 List of slaves

References

External links

Thoughts and Sentiments on the Evil and Wicked Traffic of the Slavery and Commerce of the Human Species,  London: printed in the year 1787.   Online text at Eighteenth Century Collections Online Text Creation Project, University of Michigan.
Narrative of the Enslavement of Ottobah Cugoano, a Native of Africa, London: Printed for the Author and Sold by Hatchard and Co., 1825, online text at Documenting the American South, University of North Carolina.

18th-century British writers
Abolitionism in the United Kingdom
British slave trade
1757 births
Year of death missing
English people of Ghanaian descent
Ghanaian writers
Ghanaian abolitionists
Black British former slaves
Black British writers
British abolitionists
Black British activists
People from Central Region (Ghana)
Grenadian slaves